Sukhdev Nanaji Kale was a member of the 9th Lok Sabha of India. He represented the Buldhana constituency of Maharashtra and is a member of the Bharatiya Janata Party political party.

References

People from Maharashtra
India MPs 1989–1991
Living people
Marathi politicians
Bharatiya Janata Party politicians from Maharashtra
Lok Sabha members from Maharashtra
People from Buldhana district
1955 births